Frou Frou are a British electronic duo composed of musician Imogen Heap and producer/songwriter Guy Sigsworth. They released their only album, Details, in 2002. The duo wrote, produced, and played instruments on the tracks, while Heap also provided lead vocals. In 2004, they recorded a cover of "Holding Out for a Hero" by Bonnie Tyler, which was used in the credits of the 2004 film Shrek 2. Frou Frou amicably disbanded later that year.

In 2017, Heap and Sigsworth reunited as Frou Frou for Heap's Mycelia Tour. They released an EP of unreleased Frou Frou demos for Details' 20th anniversary in 2022.

History

1997–2002: Introductions 
Heap and Sigsworth met in 1996 when Heap was 17 years old after Sigsworth was given a demo recorded by Heap and asked to meet with her. The two first collaborated when Heap contributed guest vocals to Sigsworth's band Acacia. Sigsworth later wrote two songs for Heap's 1998 debut studio album, I Megaphone, including her debut single, "Getting Scared". As Heap went on tour throughout North America and Europe to promote the album, Sigsworth continued to write and produce for other artists, including Madonna and Björk. As Heap's record label Almo Sounds lost funding, they asked Heap for a second album, and dropped her soon after being acquired by Universal, while Acacia was disbanded.

Sigsworth began work on an album in 2001, which he initially envisioned as a solo album consisting of songs written and produced by Sigsworth with features from various singers, poets, and rappers. After working with Heap on a song, Sigsworth instead decided to form Frou Frou with her, and the two began working on an album together.

2002–2003: Details 
In 2002, Frou Frou signed a record deal with Universal Records on the Island Records imprint in the UK and Europe, and MCA Records in the USA. They released their first and only album, Details in June 2002. An album of electronic music with elements of trip hop, pop and rock, the eclectic, intricately produced tracks use a wide range of traditional instruments including cellos, autoharps, guitars, keyboards, and Indian drums, with layered vocals from Heap.

The album received critical acclaim, but this did not translate into mass sales the duo had hoped for. "Breathe In" was released as the first single internationally. It reached number two on the Italian radio airplay charts, and debuted in the Top 50 in the UK Singles Chart. The follow-up singles "Must Be Dreaming" and "It's Good To Be in Love" were shelved from commercial release in the UK, however, through lack of radio and TV interest. "Breathe In" and "Must Be Dreaming" did become minor hits in Asia, particularly in Indonesia, where both singles made Top 10, peaking at number 7 and 5 respectively on the Indonesian Airplay Chart.

A video was made for a fourth single from the album, the closer "The Dumbing Down of Love", directed by Joel Peissig (who later directed Heap's solo video "Hide and Seek"). After touring the record extensively across the United States, where the duo had established a cult fan base, Frou Frou amicably disbanded in 2004.

Sigsworth was contacted in 2004 by music supervisor Chris Douridas, an early fan of Frou Frou, who asked him to record a cover version of Bonnie Tyler's 1984 song "Holding Out for a Hero" for the Shrek 2 soundtrack. Although Frou Frou was no longer active, Sigsworth reached out to Heap to record vocals for the cover, and the duo was briefly reformed. Frou Frou also gained popularity in the United States in 2004 after Zach Braff used "Let Go" on the soundtrack for his film, Garden State.

The duo also worked together in 2003 on a track for Britney Spears's fourth album In The Zone, entitled "Over To You Now". The track was written by Sigsworth, Swedish pop star Robyn and her long-term songwriting companion, and Sigsworth asked Heap to come in and make the song more suitable for Spears, adding backing vocals and making the track more electronic music-infused. Despite not being used on In The Zone, the track was released in late 2005 on the Japan CD single of Spears' single, "Someday (I Will Understand)" and on the UK and Japan bonus CDs of the DVD release of her reality TV show, Britney and Kevin: Chaotic.

2017present: Live reunion, Off Cuts 

In November 2017, it was announced that Heap and Sigsworth would be reuniting as Frou Frou during Imogen Heap's Mycelia Tour throughout 2018 and 2019. In April 2019, Frou Frou released a live recording of "Guitar Song", their first single in 15 years and one of two singles not released at the time of the band's initial break-up, through We Are Hear.

In late March 2022, Imogen Heap partnered with Symphonic Distribution to re-release previous material, including a handful of Frou Frou demos, which have been compiled into the Off Cuts EP, released on 3 June 2022, just shy of Details' 20th anniversary. The first single "A New Kind of Love (Demo)" was released 8 April. A studio version of the "Guitar Song" demo released as the second single on 6 May.

Artistry
Frou Frou's music has been described as electronic, electropop, synth-pop, and alternative pop.

Discography

Studio albums

Extended plays

Singles

See also 
List of ambient music artists

References

 Vincent Jeffries. Frou Frou. MTV.com. Accessed 29 August 2004.

External links 

 Frou Frou
 Imogen Heap
 Guy Sigsworth

British electronic music groups
Island Records artists
MCA Records artists
Musical groups disestablished in 2003
Musical groups established in 2002
Trip hop groups
Electronic music duos
Musical groups reestablished in 2017
British ambient music groups
Downtempo musicians

fr:Imogen Heap#Frou Frou